Astele punctocostata is a species of sea snail, a marine gastropod mollusk in the family Calliostomatidae.

Distribution
The type specimen was found off the island of Capul, Northern Samar, the Philippines.

References

External links
 To World Register of Marine Species

punctocostata
Gastropods described in 1853